The histamine receptors are a class of G protein–coupled receptors which bind histamine as their primary endogenous ligand.

There are four known histamine receptors:
H1 receptor 
H2 receptor 
H3 receptor 
H4 receptor

Comparison

There are several splice variants of H3 present in various species. Though all of the receptors are 7-transmembrane g protein coupled receptors, H1 and H2 are quite different from H3 and H4 in their activities. H1 causes an increase in PIP2 hydrolysis, H2 stimulates gastric acid secretion, and H3 mediates feedback inhibition of histamine.

References

External links

Holger Stark: Histamine Receptors, BIOTREND Reviews No. 01, November 2007
The Histamine Receptor
 

Integral membrane proteins
Histamine receptors